Dave Depper is an American musician and multi-instrumentalist, best known as the guitarist and keyboardist for the indie rock band Death Cab for Cutie.

Music career 
Depper began his career playing with various Pacific NW artists, including Menomena, Fruit Bats, Mirah, Corin Tucker, and Laura Gibson. In 2014, Depper joined Ray LaMontagne's touring band; he was later recruited by Indie Rock pioneers Death Cab for Cutie during their 2015 world tour in support of their eighth album, Kintsugi. Following the departure of member Chris Walla, Depper and fellow musician Zac Rae joined Death Cab as full-time members, receiving credits on the band's ninth album, Thank You for Today.

In 2017, Depper released his first solo album, Emotional Freedom Technique, which was well-received by critics.

Personal life 
Depper grew up in Bend, Oregon and currently lives in Portland. He attended the University of Oregon, where he studied computer and information science, graduating in 2002. He then worked as a software engineer for several years before transitioning to working as a touring musician full-time. Depper shares a passion for distance running with bandmate Ben Gibbard, often running between 6 and 12 miles before shows. He has a Siamese cat named Doctor Wu, after the Steely Dan song of the same name.

References 

American male guitarists
Living people
Death Cab for Cutie members
Year of birth missing (living people)
People from Bend, Oregon